The 1919 Baltimore mayoral election saw the election of William Frederick Broening.

General election
The general election was held May 6.

References

Baltimore mayoral
Mayoral elections in Baltimore
Baltimore